Icod or Icode was one of nine menceyatos guanches (native kingdoms) that had divided the island of Tenerife (Canary Islands, Spain) after the death of mencey Tinerfe. 

It occupied a part of the extension of the existing municipalities of El Tanque, La Guancha, Icod de los Vinos as well as part of Garachico. His last mencey was Pelinor.

References

External links 
 Menceyatos de Tenerife

Icode
Former kingdoms